Jérémy Taravel (born 17 April 1987) is a French professional footballer who plays as a centre-back.

Career
Jérémy Taravel began his career as a professional footballer at the second team of Lille after working his way up from the youth academy. A loan spell at Troyes AC in 2008 was unsuccessful as he did not manage a single appearance but the next year, on 2 January 2009, he was loaned to Belgian side S.V. Zulte Waregem. For a period while on loan, Taravel was consistently a starter in the first team; Zulte Waregem exercised their buy option included in the deal and signed him on a permanent basis from Lille.

On 24 June 2010, Taravel signed a three-year contract with Belgian side K.S.C. Lokeren Oost-Vlaanderen, transferring from Zulte Waregem. Over the next three and a half years at Lokeren Oost-Vlaanderen, he amassed 125 appearances and scored 25 goals.

His consistent performances at Lokeren persuaded Croatian side Dinamo Zagreb to acquire Taravel for €1.6 million in January 2014. Taravel made just one appearance for Dinamo Zagreb that season, in a 2–1 home win over RNK Split due to a severe knee ligaments injury in training which ruled him out for the rest of the season.

With dwindling performances due to injuries, Taravel transferred to Belgian side Gent in August 2016 for €500,000 fee. He failed to meet the expectations during the 2016–17 season which prompted a loan move to Swiss side FC Sion in February 2017.

Taravel joined Cercle Brugge in August 2017; on 13 August 2021, he joined Mouscron on a one-year deal with an option for extension.

Personal life
Taravel is the older brother of Nicolas Taravel, who is also a professional footballer.

Honours
Lokeren
Belgian Cup: 2011–12

References

External links
 

1987 births
Living people
French footballers
French expatriate footballers
K.S.C. Lokeren Oost-Vlaanderen players
US Créteil-Lusitanos players
Lille OSC players
S.V. Zulte Waregem players
GNK Dinamo Zagreb players
K.A.A. Gent players
FC Sion players
Cercle Brugge K.S.V. players
Royal Excel Mouscron players
Belgian Pro League players
Challenger Pro League players
Croatian Football League players
Swiss Super League players
INF Clairefontaine players
French expatriate sportspeople in Belgium
Expatriate footballers in Belgium
Expatriate footballers in Croatia
Expatriate footballers in Switzerland
Association football defenders
People from Vincennes
Footballers from Val-de-Marne